Park Sun-yong (born 12 March 1989) is a South Korean footballer who plays as a midfielder for Pohang Steelers in the K League 1. His younger brother Park Sun-ju is also a footballer.

External links 

Park Sun-yong at dragons.co.kr

1989 births
Living people
Association football midfielders
South Korean footballers
Jeonnam Dragons players
Pohang Steelers players
Asan Mugunghwa FC players
K League 1 players